Syntaxin-5 is a protein that in humans is encoded by the STX5 gene.

Interactions 

STX5 has been shown to interact with:

 BET1L, 
 GOSR1, 
 GOSR2, 
 NAPA,  and
 USO1.

References

Further reading